Blastococcus endophyticus  is a bacterium from the genus of Blastococcus which has been isolated from the leaves of the plant Camptotheca acuminata from Yunnan in China.

References

 

Bacteria described in 2013
Actinomycetia